George William Brown Jr. (September 23, 1923 – January 21, 2013) was an American and Canadian football player who played in the AAFC, NFL and CFL, with the New York Yankees, New York Yanks, BC Lions and Edmonton Eskimos. He previously played football at Texas Christian University and at North Side High School in Fort Worth, Texas.

References

1923 births
2013 deaths
American football offensive guards
Canadian football guards
American players of Canadian football
TCU Horned Frogs football players
New York Yanks players
New York Yankees (AAFC) players
BC Lions players
Edmonton Elks players
Players of American football from Texas
People from Boyd, Texas